"Come and Get with Me" is the lead single from Keith Sweat's sixth studio album, Still in the Game. The song was produced by Keith Sweat himself and featured two rapped verses from Snoop Dogg.

The song became Sweat's seventh top-40 single on the Billboard Hot 100, peaking at No. 12 on the chart. It also became his fifth and final single to earn a gold certification for sales of 500,000 copies, accomplishing the feat on November 9, 1998. The official remix was produced by Clark Kent and featured Noreaga in place of Snoop Dogg.

Track listing
"Come and Get with Me" (Radio Edit)- 4:09
"Come and Get with Me" (Radio Version)- 4:55
"Come Get and with Me" (Clarksworld Remix)-

Charts

Weekly charts

Year-end charts

Certifications

References

1998 singles
Elektra Records singles
Music videos directed by Christopher Erskin
Snoop Dogg songs
Keith Sweat songs
Songs written by Snoop Dogg
Songs written by Keith Sweat